An independence referendum was held in the Republic of Macedonia on 8 September 1991, which afterwards proclaimed independence from Yugoslavia. It was approved by 96.4% of votes, with a turnout of 75.7%. North Macedonia celebrates 8 September as Independence Day.

Results

References

Independence referendums
Referendums in North Macedonia
Macedonia
1991 in international relations
1991 in the Republic of Macedonia
Referendums in Yugoslavia
September 1991 events in Europe